Jan Hájek and Lukáš Lacko were the defending champions but lost in the semifinals to Philipp Marx and Florin Mergea.
Lukáš Dlouhý and Michail Elgin defeated Marx and Mergea 6–7(5–7), 6–2, [10–6] in the final.

Seeds

Draw

Draw

References
 Main Draw

Slovak Open - Doubles
2012 Men's Doubles